Richard E. Robbins is an American filmmaker and documentary maker, who has produced and directed several documentaries for ABC and PBS. The most notable is Operation Homecoming: Writing the Wartime Experience, which puts forward the perspective of American troops returning home from service in Iraq. In January 2008, Robbins received an Academy Award nomination for the film as well as two Emmy nominations, and nominations from the International Documentary Association and the Directors Guild of America. He is also a noted producer, having produced several series for Peter Jennings Reporting, including Peter Jennings Reporting: LAPD and Peter Jennings Reporting: Dark Horizon – India, Pakistan, and the Bomb. He was a producer for the ABC special The Century: America's Time."

He is a graduate of Harvard College.

ProducedOperation Homecoming 2007
 Peter Jennings Reporting: LAPD 2004
 Peter Jennings Reporting: I Have a Dream 2003 History Undercover: Uprising! Afghanistan's Deadliest Battle 2003
 Peter Jennings Reporting: Dark Horizon – India, Pakistan, and the Bomb''  2000

See also
Peter Jennings
American cinema
History of Film

References

Year of birth missing (living people)
Living people
American documentary film directors
American film producers
Harvard College alumni